Triglidae, commonly known as gurnards or sea robins, are a family of bottom-feeding scorpaeniform ray-finned fish. The gurnards are distributed in temperate and tropical seas worldwide.

Taxonomy
Triglidae was first described as a family in 1815 by the French polymath and naturalist Constantine Samuel Rafinesque. In 1883 Jordan and Gilbert formally designated Trigla lyra, which had been described by Linnaeus in 1758, as the type species of the genus Trigla and so of the family Triglidae. The 5th edition of Fishes of the World classifies this family within the suborder Platycephaloidei in the order Scorpaeniformes. Other authorities differ and do not consider the Scorpaeniformes to be a valid order because the Perciformes is not monophyletic without the taxa within the Scorpaeniformes being included within it. These authorities consider the Triglidae to belong to the suborder Triglioidei, along with the family Peristediidae, within the Perciformes. The family Peristediidae is included in the Triglidae as the subfamily Peristediinae by some authorities.

Etymology
Triglidae's name is based on that of Linneaus's genus Trigla, the name of which is a classical name for the red mullet (Mullus barbatus), Artedi thought the red mullet and the gurnards were the same as fishes from both taxa are known to create sounds taken out of the water as well as being red in colour. Linnaeus realised they were different and classified Trigla as a gurnard, in contradiction of the ancient usage. They get one of their common names, sea robin, from the orange ventral surface of the species in the genus Prionotus, and from large pectoral fins which resemble a bird's wings. The other common name, gurnard, was given to them because when caught, they make a croaking noise similar to a frog, which has given them the onomatopoeic name gurnard.

Subfamilies and genera
Triglidae is divided into 3 subfamilies and 9 genera as follows:

 Prionotinae Kaup, 1873
 Bellator Jordan & Evermann, 1896
 Prionotus Lacépède, 1801
 Pterygotriglinae Fowler, 1938
 Bovitrigla Fowler, 1938
 Pterygotrigla Waite, 1899
 Triglinae Rafinesque, 1815
 Chelidonichthys Kaup, 1873
 Eutrigla Fraser-Brunner, 1938
 Lepidotrigla Günther, 1860
 Trigla Linnaeus, 1758
These subfamilies have been given the rank of tribe, Prionotini, Pterygotriglini and Triglini, by some authorities. Prionotinae are regarded as the basal grouping with Triglinae being the most derived.

Characteristics
Triglidae gurnards have mouths which are either terminal or positioned slightly below the snout, which has its tip normally having paired rostral projections, frequently armed with spines, and these create the impression of a 2 lobed snout when seen from above. There are no barbels on the head and the preorbital bones typically project forward. The lower 3 rays of the pectoral fins are enlarged and free of the fin membrane. They have two separate dorsal fins, the first having between 7 and 11 spines while the second has 10 to 23 soft rays. The anal fin may not have any spines or it can have a single spine and 11 to 23 soft rays. The head is bony and resemble a casque. There are 9 or 10 branched rays in the caudal fin.

They have an unusually solid skull, and many species also possess armored plates on their bodies. Another distinctive feature is the presence of a "drumming muscle" that makes sounds by beating against the swim bladder.  

Sea robins have three "walking rays" on each side of their body. They are derived from the supportive structures in the pectoral fins, called fin-rays. During development, the fin-rays separate from the rest of the pectoral fin, developing into walking rays. These walking rays have specialized muscle divisions and unique anatomy that differ from typical fin-rays to allow them to be used as supportive structures during underwater locomotion. These walking rays have been shown to be used for locomotion as well as prey detection on the seafloor via chemoreception highly sensitive to the amino acids prevalent in some marine invertebrates.Bardach, J. & Case, J. Sensory capabilities of the modified fins of squirrel hake (Urophycis chuss) and searobins (Prionotus carolinus and P. evolans). Copeia 1965, 194–206 (1965)

 As food 
Gurnard have firm white flesh that holds together well in cooking, making them well-suited to soups and stews. They are commonly used in the French dish bouillabaisse''. One source describes gurnards as "rather bony and lacking in flavour"; others praise its flavour and texture.

They were often caught in British waters as a bycatch and discarded. However, as other species became less sustainable and more expensive they became more popular, with the wholesale price between 2007 and 2008 reported to have increased from £0.25 per kg to £4, and sales increasing tenfold by 2011. Gurnards also are now appearing in fish markets in the U.S.

Angling 
Sea robins can be caught by dropping a variety of baits and lures to the seafloor, where they actively feed. Mackerel is believed to be the most efficient bait for catching sea robins, but crabs, bunker and other fish meat can also be used successfully depending on location. Sea robins can also be caught by lure fishing if lured near the substrate. They are often considered to be rough fish, caught when fishing for more desirable fish such as striped bass or flounder. Gurnard are also used as bait, for example by lobster fishermen.

References

External links
 
 

Platycephaloidei
 
Marine fish families
Taxa named by Antoine Risso